The Battle of the Bridge is the name of the all-sports rivalry between the Canisius Golden Griffins and the Niagara Purple Eagles. Both schools are members of the Metro Atlantic Athletic Conference. The two teams compete every school year in 14 sports; men's baseball, men's and women's basketball, men's and women's cross country, men's golf, men's ice hockey, women's lacrosse, men's and women's soccer, women's softball, men's and women's swimming & diving, and women's volleyball. The overall winner of the annual series receives the Canal Cup trophy. The two long time Western New York rivals created the trophy in 2007 to enhance the historic rivalry between the two schools. The name of the series is a reference to the Grand Island Bridge, which each team crosses when traveling along I-190 to the other's campus. The name of the trophy is a reference to the Erie Canal, which separates Erie County, where Canisius is located, and Niagara County, where Niagara is located.

Overall results

References

College basketball rivalries in the United States
College sports rivalries in the United States
Canisius Golden Griffins
Niagara Purple Eagles
2006 establishments in New York (state)